The Illinois Fighting Illini baseball team is the varsity intercollegiate athletic team of the University of Illinois Urbana-Champaign in Champaign, Illinois, United States. The team competes in the National Collegiate Athletic Association's Division I and are members of the Big Ten Conference.

History

Coaching history

Year-by-year results

Reference:

NCAA tournament results

Attendance records

Retired numbers

Current MLB players
 Michael Massey (Kansas City Royals)

Individual honors

Player of the year awards

 2018
Bren Spillane, (1B/OF), Collegiate Baseball Player of the Year

All-Americans
Note that information below is referenced from Illinois Fighting Illini Media Guide.

1947
Andy Phillip, (1B)
Lee Eilbracht, (C)
1948
Russ Steger, (OF)
1951
Dick Raklovits, (3B)
1959
Bob Klaus, (SS)
1962
Tom Fletcher, (P)
1973
Bob Polock, (2B)
1987
Darrin Fletcher, (C)
1988
Mark Dalesandro, (2B)
1989
Sean Mulligan, (C)
Charles "Bubba" Smith, (UT)
1990
Mark Dalesandro, (2B)
1991
Sean Mulligan, (C)
Charles "Bubba" Smith, (UT)
Larry Sutton, (OF)
Scott Spiezio, (IF)
1992
Larry Sutton, (OF)
1993
Scott Spiezio, (IF)
1994
Forry Wells, (OF)
Tom Sinak, (OF)

1996
Josh Klimek (SS)
Brian McClure, (2B)
1998
James Tow, (P)
D.J. Svihlik, (2B)
1999
James Tow, (P)
D.J. Svihlik, (2B)
Luke Simmons, (DH)
2000
Jason Anderson (P)
Andy Schutzenhofer, (1B)
D.J. Svihlik, (2B)
2001
Andy Dickinson (P)
2002
Andy Dickinson (P)
Drew Davidson, (OF)
2003
Eric Eymann, (SS)
2005
Drew Davidson, (OF)
2007
Lars Davis (C)
2013
Justin Parr, (OF)
2015
Tyler Jay, (P)
2016
Cody Sedlock, (P)
 2018
Bren Spillane, (1B/OF)

Illini in the World Series
 Carl Lundgren, 
 Garland "Jake" Stahl, 
 Wally Roettger, 
 Lou Boudreau, 
 Tom Haller, 
 Ed Spiezio, 
 Ken Holtzman, 
 Scott Spiezio,

References

External links